Rauchtown is a census-designated place in Crawford Township, Clinton County, and a small portion in Limestone Township, Lycoming County, in the U.S. state of Pennsylvania. As of the 2010 census the population was 726.

Rauchtown is on Pennsylvania Route 880 on the border between southeastern Clinton County and southwestern Lycoming County, at the western end of the Nippenose Valley, between Bald Eagle Mountain to the north and Nippenose Mountain to the south. Ravensburg State Park is on the southern edge of Rauchtown, in the narrow valley of Rauchtown Creek coming out of Nippenose Mountain.

References

Census-designated places in Clinton County, Pennsylvania
Census-designated places in Lycoming County, Pennsylvania
Census-designated places in Pennsylvania